"King of the Mountain" a song written by Larry Boone and Paul Nelson. First recorded in 1991 by George Jones for his album And Along Came Jones, the song was also cut by Boone on his 1993 album Get in Line.

It was later covered by American country music artist George Strait, and was released in December 1996 as the fourth and final single from his album Blue Clear Sky. The song reached #19 in the United States and number 27 in Canada. Even though the song was his lowest peaking single since 1992's, "Lovesick Blues", it was one of the most critically acclaimed country songs in years.

Critical reception
Deborah Evans Price, of Billboard magazine reviewed the song favorably, calling it a "lyrically powerful weeper, and Strait's performance exudes oceans of mournful regret."

Chart performance
"King of the Mountain" debuted at number 48 on the U.S. Billboard Hot Country Singles & Tracks for the week of December 21, 1996.

References

1991 songs
1996 singles
George Jones songs
Larry Boone songs
George Strait songs
Songs written by Larry Boone
Song recordings produced by Tony Brown (record producer)
Songs written by Paul Nelson (songwriter)
MCA Records singles